Dheeraj Sarna is an Indian television actor, writer and producer. He is known for portraying the role of Yash on Kutumb (TV series) and lead role of Amarnath Awasthi on the comedy show Belan Wali Bahu, that aired on Colors TV.

Career
Sarna started his acting career in the year 2000 by guest starring in an episode of Kaahin Kissii Roz as Aseem. In the same year he was cast in a TV show Kutumb as Yash, the show written by himself. He then took a long break from acting from 2002 to 2017, so he could focus on writing for different shows and films including Koi Aap Sa and Kis Kisko Pyaar Karoon, the two films that he wrote a screenplay for. In early 2018, he returned to acting when he was cast in the comedy television series Belan Wali Bahu, opposite Krystle D'Souza, that premiered in January 2018. The show was written and produced by himself.

Personal life
Saran is married to television actress Supriya Sarna. They have one son called Shivansh.

Filmography

Awards and nominations

References

External links 

Living people
Male actors in Hindi cinema
Indian male soap opera actors
Indian male television actors
Indian male film actors
Male actors from Mumbai
Year of birth missing (living people)
Actors from Mumbai